Alan William Lilley is a first-class cricketer. He was born in Ilford on 8 May 1959 and played for Essex from 1978 to 1990 during the most successful period in their history. A right-handed opening batsman, he scored 4495 runs in 120 first-class matches with a best of 113* and a further 2800 in one day games. 

Lilley top-scored in the final of the Benson & Hedges Cup in 1989 with 95 not out, although he finished on the losing side on this occasion as Nottinghamshire won off the last ball. He also played at Lord's as Essex beat Nottinghamshire in the final of the 1985 NatWest Trophy (although not required to bat on that occasion). Essex won four County Championships while he was with the county, in 1979, 1983, 1984 and 1986.

Later worked for the county as an administrator.

References

1959 births
Living people
English cricketers
Essex cricketers
People from Ilford